The Gull River is a river in Minnesota.  It is a tributary of the Turtle River, a tributary of the Mississippi River.

See also
List of rivers of Minnesota

References

External links 
Minnesota Watersheds
USGS Hydrologic Unit Map - State of Minnesota (1974)

Rivers of Minnesota